Thomas Richard Blanchard (born May 28, 1948) is a former American football punter with an 11-year career in the National Football League for the New York Giants, New Orleans Saints, and the Tampa Bay Buccaneers.

Biography
Blanchard played college football at the University of Oregon, where he was quarterback as well as punter.  He led Grants Pass High School to the 1964 state high school football championship as a junior.

Blanchard was drafted by the Giants in 12th round of the 1971 NFL Draft.  After 3 years with the Giants he was beaten out for the punting position during the preseason by rookie Dave Jennings and waived.

He was signed by the Saints one game into the 1974 season after the Saints waived their opening day punter Donnie Gibbs after Gibbs had fumbled a snap leading to the Saints to lose their first game of the season.  With the Saints in 1974 he kicked a 71 yard punt, which was the longest punt in the NFL that season.  In 1975 he led the NFL with 3776 punting yards and in 1976 he led the NFL with 101 punts.

He was traded by the Saints to the Buccaneers for a draft pick before the 1979 season after the Saints drafted placekicker Russell Erxleben, who was also able to punt, in the first round of the 1979 NFL Draft.  Blanchard injured his hamstring in the Bucs' third game of the 1981 season and was waived after recovering, with Larry Swider taking his job in the interim.

His two sons, Tommy (the eldest) and Jimmy (five years the junior) both were starting quarterbacks at Grants Pass High School, leading their respective teams to the playoffs.  Tommy's son Jace also played quarterback at Grants Pass High School.  After retiring as a player, spent time as the football coach, softball coach and athletic director at Grants Pass High School.  He retired from these positions in 2013.

References

1948 births
Living people
American football punters
American football quarterbacks
New Orleans Saints players
New York Giants players
Oregon Ducks football players
Tampa Bay Buccaneers players
Sportspeople from Grants Pass, Oregon
Players of American football from Oregon